Al Ghanim is a sub-district located in Ash Sharyah District, Al Bayda Governorate, Yemen. Al Ghanim had a population of 33873 according to the 2004 census.

References 

Sub-districts in Ash Sharyah District